John Pickering (18 December 1908 – 10 May 1977) was an English footballer who played for Sheffield United between 1925 and 1948. He played in the position of inside left.

Pickering learned his football at Barnsley Grammar School and Mortomley St. Saviours from where he came directly to United at the age of 17, in 1925. He was a tall, long striding attacking player, and was instantly seen as a successor to Billy Gillespie at inside-forward. Jack was a part-time player, first working as a bookmaker and then an accountant.

He was a clever manipulator of the ball and a master of the long cross field pass which had been a feature of Sheffield United's play in the 1890s. An intelligent player, he generally lay far back behind, directing his fellow forwards with discriminating passes.

Pickering became a regular first team player at the end of the 1920s as Gillespie's playing career wound down. Jack's ball control was excellent as was his passing. He played a thoughtful studied game, simple in essence, but he was also a fast runner and began to score splendid goals with hard shots often from around the edge of the six-yard box.

Yet, the United matchday programme writer in October 1930 grumbled that Pickering did not put 'enough ginger' into his play and judged him as 'moody'.

He was chosen for the Football League side in 1932 and for the Rest against England in an international trial in March 1933. The Rest forward line played so well (winning 5-1) that they were all chosen to play Scotland at Hampden Park. Pickering received what turned out to be his only international cap for England in that match.

Pickering scored two goals in the FA Cup 5th round tie against Leeds United at Bramall Lane on 15 February 1936, in a match watched by a record crowd of 68,287.

He possessed a strong shot and played in 39 matches in season 1935-36, scoring 17 goals as United reached the 1936 FA Cup Final. Pickering partnered striker Bobby Barclay in the final against Arsenal at Wembley Stadium, and both impressed with their stylish distribution and approach play. But it was not to be United's day and they lost the match 1–0.

In season 1938–39, Pickering was partnered with Jimmy Hagan in possibly one of the Blades' most exciting teams of the 1900s. When World War II broke out, United were standing at the top of the First Division - the season was canceled after just three matches.

He played in Wartime matches for Sheffield United, and made eleven appearances in the team which won the League North title in season 1945-46. The first post-war season saw him make just one appearance and that was in the Championship decider against Stoke City. Pickering scored United's second goal that was to take the title to Liverpool with United finishing sixth in Division One.

In a career that spanned 22 seasons, he made his final appearance for Sheffield United against Portsmouth at Bramall Lane on 1 January 1948 when he was 39 years old. Overall, he made 344 league appearances and scored 102 league goals, in a career exclusively with United.

Pickering had trained as an accountant, and he cut his formal links with the soccer world taking a hotel in Bournemouth. He died aged 68.

Sheffield United career

Club

References and notes

1908 births
1977 deaths
Footballers from Sheffield
English footballers
England international footballers
Sheffield United F.C. players
Association football inside forwards
English Football League players
English Football League representative players
FA Cup Final players